PowerTrike GmbH is a German aircraft manufacturer based in Mackenbach. At one time the company specialized in the design and manufacture of ultralight trikes and powered parachutes, but today produces just the Best Off Skyranger kit aircraft as the SkyRanger SW.

By November 2014 the company was operating under the name Volksflugzeug GmbH.

Aircraft

References

External links

Company website archives on Archive.org

Aircraft manufacturers of Germany
Ultralight trikes
Powered parachutes
Homebuilt aircraft